Rotraut Wisskirchen (23 June 1936 – 1 August 2018) was a German Biblical archaeologist.

Wisskirchen was born on 23 June 1936 in Hagen and studied law in Munich and Bonn; then she worked from 1965 to 1967 as a lawyer in the Federal Ministry of Housing and Urban Development. She was married to the lawyer Alfred Wisskirchen, with whom she had two daughters, also lawyers.

In 1981 she began studying Christian Archeology, Ancient Church History and Patrology at the University of Bonn, graduating in 1989 with Josef Engemann. The topic of the dissertation was The mosaic program of S. Prassede in Rome. Iconography and iconology. From 1989 to 2017 she was a regular lecturer at the Universities of Bonn, Mainz, Cologne, Bochum and Wuppertal. Through regular annual excursions to the archaeologically relevant sites, she made sure that students got to know the scenes of late antique history in southern Europe and the Middle East from their own point of view. In 2000, the Catholic Theological Faculty of the University of Bochum appointed her - as the second woman and first Protestant - honorary professor. In 2011, she was awarded the Cross of Merit on the ribbon of the Order of Merit of the Federal Republic of Germany.

External links 
Homepage an der Universität Bochum
 Bericht zur Berufung zur Professorin
 Bericht zur Antrittsvorlesung
Bericht zur Verabschiedung
Literatur von Rotraut Wisskirchen

References

1936 births
2018 deaths
People from Hagen
Archaeologists from North Rhine-Westphalia
German women archaeologists
20th-century archaeologists
21st-century archaeologists
German women lawyers
20th-century German lawyers
German women academics
Historians of the Catholic Church
University of Bonn alumni
Ludwig Maximilian University of Munich alumni
Academic staff of the University of Bonn
Academic staff of Ruhr University Bochum
Academic staff of Johannes Gutenberg University Mainz
Academic staff of the University of Cologne
Academic staff of the University of Wuppertal
Recipients of the Cross of the Order of Merit of the Federal Republic of Germany